Antonio Alejandro Franco Arza (born 10 July 1991) is a Paraguayan footballer who plays for Club Guaraní in the Paraguayan Primera División.

Club career
Franco became known internationally after his great performance against Boca Juniors in the 2014 Copa Sudamericana.

International career
After strong performances at the club was first called up to the Paraguay friendlies against  Peru in November 2014.

References

External links
 
 
 
 
 

1991 births
Living people
Paraguayan footballers
Paraguay international footballers
Deportivo Capiatá players
Association football goalkeepers